Harpalus azumai is a species of ground beetle in the subfamily Harpalinae. It was described by Habu in 1968.

References

azumai
Beetles described in 1968